The Sunkar is one of two aerobatic teams in the Kazakh Air Defense Forces which performs aerobatics during events in Kazakhstan from combat training Aero L-39 Albatros. In the Kazakh language, the name of the group is translated as "Falcon".

History
The group was formed in the fall of 2010. At its disposal received six L-39 training aircraft. It gained fame at the International Exhibition of Arms and Military-Technical Equipment (KADEX) the following March in Astana. The culmination of the Defender of the Fatherland Day Battle Parade in 2018 and 2013 featured the team fly over 40th Otar Military Base. It has also demonstrated its skills during the celebrations of Air Force Day every year.

References

Aerobatic teams
Military units and formations established in 2010
Kazakh Air Defense Forces
Kazakhstani ceremonial units